Super Muñeco (Super Doll) (10 April 1952 – 9 February 2022) was a Mexican Luchador enmascarado, or masked professional wrestler. Super Muñeco is Spanish for "Super Doll", a comedic ring character based on a clown. Super Muñeco is best known for having the second highest number of Luchas de Apuestas "bet match" wins, having won the mask or hair of over 100 wrestlers. Per the tradition of masked wrestlers in Mexico, Super's real name and identity have not yet been revealed.

Super Muñeco was the son of professional wrestler El Sanguinario (The Bloodthirsty) and initially worked as Sanguinario Jr. before changing his ring persona to Super Muñeco. Muñeco's brothers wrestle or have wrestled as Sanguianrio, Jr. and Sanguinario, Jr. III, while a third brother wrestles as "Super Muñeco, Jr.". Super Muñeco was one third of the team Trío Fantasía (Fantasy Trio) along with Super Ratón and Super Pinocho, a trio with ring personas geared towards the kids in the crowd.

Professional wrestling career
Muñeco made his professional wrestling debut on March 22, 1982, working under the name "Sanguinario, Jr." named after his father "El Sanguinario". Initially he teamed with his father, but did not make much headway under the "Sanguinario, Jr." name. One day in late 1983 Muñeco's girlfriend commented that it was odd he played a bloodthirsty Rudo (a villainous character or Heel) when it was so unlike who he really was. The comment set off an idea, based on a famous Mexican "Tramp Clown" called "El Tramposo", he developed a "wrestling clown" ring character called "Super Muñeco" (Super Doll in Spanish), complete with a mask that looked like a smiling clown face. With the Super Muñeco character he quickly became a Tecnico (a good guy or Face), especially popular with children. Initially, other wrestlers did not like the comedic persona nor did they like to work with and lose to "a clown" causing them to work "stiff", by actually punching him or twisting joints a bit harder than necessary to show their displeasure. In the mid-1980s Super Muñeco worked mainly at "Pavillón Azteca" and became one of the main attractions on their weekly shows. He became one of the first television stars when Lucha Libre returned to regular television in the 1980s, helping the show Super Lunes (Super Monday) attract good ratings and drawing a full crowd whenever he was on the Pavillón Azteca shows.

Super Muñeco teamed up with Super Ráton (a wrestler using a Mighty Mouse ring persona) and Super Pinocho (Based on the character Pinocchio) to form Trio Fantasia, a comedy trio that became popular with fans. Together Trio Fantasia won the Distrito Federal Trios Championship and the AWWA Trios Championship. The team also worked against other teams with similar kid-oriented comedy themes, drawing full houses for their storyline feud with Los Tortugas Ninja (four men wearing Teenage Mutant Ninja Turtles costumes), the storyline even saw Trio Fantasia team up with the promising local "Coliseo 2000" to defeat Los Tortugas in a Luchas de Apuestas, mask vs. mask, match. Trio Fantasia would also unmask Los Thundercats (a trio wrestling as Leono, Panthro and Tigro from the ThunderCats cartoon). In the early 1990s Trio Fantasia began working for Asistencia Asesoría y Administración (AAA), a professional wrestling promotion with a reputation of using ring personas that were more child-friendly, such as "Los Power Raiders" (A group of Power Rangers imitators). In AAA Super Pinocho intentionally unmasked La Parka so that a photographer could get a picture of his face; This action caused him to be very unpopular with both wrestlers and promoters and he retired from wrestling. Super Ráton left AAA not long after leaving Super Muñeco as a singles competitor.

Muñeco began working a storyline against Los Payasos (the clowns), a group of Rudo clowns that were the complete opposite of everything Super Muñeco stood for. On May 22, 1994, Muñeco, Ángel Azteca, and El Hijo del Santo teamed up to win the Mexican National Trios Championship from Los Payasos. The makeshift trio held the title for four months before losing it to Los Payasos. On April 15, 1995, Super Muñeco, Rey Misterio, Jr., and Octagón defeated Los Destructores (Tony Arce, Vulcano, and Rocco Valente) to win the Mexican National Trios Title. They held it for three months before losing the championship to Fuerza Guerrera, Psicosis, and Blue Panther. After losing the Trios title Muñeco worked more as a singles wrestler, focusing on winning Luchas de Apuestas, adding mask and hair wins to his already then impressive list of wins. He worked on the Mexican Independent circuit, making appearances for various smaller promotions. Over the years he has won over 100 Luchas de Apuestas with over 80 mask wins; the most notable being the masks of rivals Coco Rojo and Coco Negro and Coco Verde of Los Payasos (although all of three may have not been the originals), Medico Asesino, Jr. and one of the numerous Hijo del Huracan Ramírez. Super Muñeco's Apuesta record is only surpassed by Estrella Blanca who has over 200 confirmed Luchas de Apuestas wins.

Personal life and death
Super Muñeco was the son of Hebert Alejandro Palafox Montiel, who wrestled as El Sanguinario. One of his brothers works as Sanguinario Jr., the third to actually use the name; another brother used the name as well but now works as "El Tramposo", a "clown tramp" gimmick. The wrestler working as "Super Muñeco Jr." is not, as the name would otherwise suggest Muñeco's son, but a third brother who uses the name. Muñeco was married for over 20 years. It was his wife's suggestion that sparked the idea for Super Muñeco. Together the couple had at least one child. He died in Mexico City on 9 February 2022, at the age of 69.

Championships and accomplishments
Asistencia Asesoría y Administración
Mexican National Trios Championship (2 times) – with Ángel Azteca and El Hijo del Santo (1), Rey Misterio Jr. and Octagón (1)
AWWA
AWWA World Junior Light Heavyweight Championship (1 time)
AWWA Trios Championship (1 time) – with Super Ratón and Super Pinocho
Comision de Box y Lucha D.F.
Distrito Federal Trios Championship (1 time) – with Super Ratón and Super Pinocho)
World Wrestling Association
WWA Middleweight Championship (1 time)
Mexican local promotions
Caribian Light Heavyweight Championship (1 time)
Centro Social Aragón Middleweight Championship (1 time)
Deportivo Carlos Zárante Middleweight Championship (1 time)
Los Reyes Estado de Mexico Middleweight Championship (1 time)
Plaza de Torero La Aurora Middleweight Championship (1 time)
Rio Verde Junior Light Heavyweight Championship (1 time)
San Pedro Iztacalco Welterweight Championship (1 time)
Veracruz Junior Light Heavyweight Championship (1 time)
WOWC Los Angeles Championship (1 time)

Luchas de Apuestas record

Notes

References
General – Luchas de Apuestas record

Specific sources

1962 births
2022 deaths
Masked wrestlers
Mexican male professional wrestlers
Professional wrestlers from Mexico City
Mexican National Trios Champions
20th-century professional wrestlers
21st-century professional wrestlers